Daniel Procházka (born 5 March 1995) is a Czech footballer is a former professional footballer who last played for Vyšehrad.

Career

As a youth player, Procházka had operations on both knees.

In 2013, he trialed for the youth academy of Barcelona, one of Spain's most successful clubs.

Before the second half of 2015/16, Procházka signed for Ústí in the Czech second division after playing for the youth academy of Czech top flight side Teplice where he made 76 appearances and scored 9 goals.

Procházka is eligible to represent Vietnam internationally through his father.

References

External links
 
 Daniel Procházka at Livesport.cz

Czech people of Vietnamese descent
Living people
Czech footballers
1995 births
Association football wingers
Czech National Football League players
FK Ústí nad Labem players
FC Hradec Králové players
FC Slavoj Vyšehrad players
Association football midfielders